Daniel Patrick Keenan (10 March 1919 – 19 September 1990) was an Irish Gaelic games administrator, Gaelic football coach, selector and former player. He was the president of the Gaelic Athletic Association from 1973 until 1976.

Born in Elphin, County Roscommon, Keenan was introduced to Gaelic football in his youth. At club level he first lined out as a minor with Elphin. In a distinguished career spanning three decades, Keenan won two championship medals with Elphin, having earlier won a championship medal with University College Dublin.

Keenan made his debut on the inter-county scene when he first linked up with the Roscommon junior team. An All-Ireland medallist in this grade, Keenan later made his senior football debut. He went on to play a key role for Roscommon during a hugely successful era, and won two All-Ireland medals and four Connacht medals. He was an All-Ireland runner-up on one occasion.

As a member of the Connacht inter-provincial team on six consecutive occasions, Keenan never won a Railway Cup medal. He retired from inter-county football following the conclusion of the 1951 championship.

In retirement from playing Keenan became involved in team management and coaching. He served on the management team of the Roscommon seniors for almost two decades, winning two Connacht titles.

In Gaelic games administration Keenan served as Roscommon County Board chairman for a period from 1958 and was chairman of the Connacht Council from 1970 until his election as the 24th president of the GAA in 1973.

Honours

Elphin
Roscommon Senior Football Championship (2): 1950, 1951

University College Dublin
Sigerson Cup (1): 1945, 1946
Dublin Senior Football Championship (1): 1945 (c)

Roscommon
All-Ireland Senior Football Championship (2): 1943, 1944
Connacht Senior Football Championship (4): 1943, 1944, 1946, 1947
All-Ireland Junior Football Championship (1): 1940
Connacht Junior Football Championship (1): 1940

References

1919 births
1990 deaths
Chairmen of county boards of the Gaelic Athletic Association
Chairmen of Gaelic games governing bodies 
Connacht inter-provincial Gaelic footballers
Connacht Provincial Council administrators
Presidents of the Gaelic Athletic Association
Roscommon County Board administrators
Roscommon inter-county Gaelic footballers
UCD Gaelic footballers
20th-century Irish medical doctors